"See You Again" is a 2015 song by Wiz Khalifa featuring Charlie Puth.

See You Again may also refer to:
 "See You Again" (Miley Cyrus song), 2007
 "See You Again" (Carrie Underwood song), 2013
 "See You Again" (Tyler, the Creator song), 2017
 "See You Again", a 2013 song by I Am I
 "See You Again", a 2015 song by Elle King from Love Stuff
 "See You Again", a 2012 song by Loreen from Heal
 See You Again (TV series), a 2019 Chinese television series on Beijing TV
 See You Again (web series), a 2022 Chinese web series on iQiyi

See also
 "I'll See You Again", a 2009 song by Westlife from Where We Are
 "If I Never See You Again", a 1997 song by Wet Wet Wet
 When I See You Again, Taiwanese romantic comedy television series
 "When Can I See You Again?", a 2012 song by Owl City from Wreck-It Ralph